Nikolas Saira (born 11 February 1999) is a Finnish professional footballer who plays as a forward.

Club career 
Born in Helsinki, Saira started his career in FC Honka youth system.

On 28 January 2022, he signed with Italian Serie C club Olbia.

International career 
Saira was a youth international for Finland.

References

External links 
 
 

1999 births
Living people
Footballers from Helsinki
Finnish footballers
Association football forwards
Veikkausliiga players
Kakkonen players
Ykkönen players
FC Espoo players
HIFK Fotboll players
Myllykosken Pallo −47 players
AC Oulu players
Serie C players
Olbia Calcio 1905 players
Finnish expatriate footballers
Finnish expatriate sportspeople in Italy
Expatriate footballers in Italy
Finland youth international footballers
21st-century Finnish people